Transaction Publishers was a New Jersey-based publishing house that specialized in social science books and journals. It was located on the Livingston Campus of Rutgers University. Transaction was sold to Taylor & Francis in 2016 and merged with its Routledge imprint.

Overview
As of February 1, 2017, Transaction Publishers became a part of Routledge, of the Taylor & Francis Group.  

Transaction was an academic publisher of the social sciences. It was founded by Irving Louis Horowitz, who served as Transaction's chairman of the board and editorial director until his death in 2012.

Transaction began on July 1, 1962, as part of a multiplex grant sponsored by the Ford Foundation at Washington University in St. Louis. From beginnings as a social science magazine, Transaction: Social Science and Modern Society (later Society), Transaction Publishers evolved into a full-fledged publisher of books (Transaction Books), journals (Transaction Periodicals Consortium), and eBooks.

In 1969, Transaction relocated to the newly formed Livingston College, on the Livingston campus of Rutgers University in Piscataway, New Jersey. Many editors, authors, and advisors are drawn from the faculty. Close to 200 faculty members have been authors and editors of Transaction books.

AldineTransaction was an imprint of Transaction Publishers. Formerly a division of Walter de Gruyter, Inc., Aldine Publishing Co. was acquired by Transaction in July 2004, and the books were then published under the imprint AldineTransaction. AldineTransaction published classic books in the fields of sociology, anthropology, economics, sociobiology, physical anthropology, and public policy. It acquired book lists from Precedent Publishers in 2009 and the Rutgers Center for Urban Policy Research (CUPR) in 2011.

Transaction published more than 6,000 titles.

Transaction once published academic journals, including its flagship journal, Society; however, Transaction sold its journal publishing program to Springer Science+Business Media in 2007.

In 2010, Penn State University announced the "Irving Louis Horowitz–Transaction Publishers Archives, 1939-2009" open for public research at Penn State's Historical Collections and Labor Archives (HCLA) of The Eberly Family Special Collections Library, University Libraries. The archive documents the expansion of social science research over the past half century.

References

External links
 
 Irving Louis Horowitz-Transaction Publishers Archives, 1939-2009 online searchable archive at Penn State

Book publishing companies based in New Jersey
Publishing companies established in 1962
Rutgers University publications